The Glasgow Society of Lady Artists was founded in 1882 by eight female students of the Glasgow School of Art with the aim of affording due recognition to women in the field of art. It has been described by Jude Burkhauser as "the first residential club in Scotland run by and for women". In the early days of the club, they met at 136 Wellington Street, Glasgow.

The names of the founding members are somewhat under discussion, but they are thought to include: first president Georgina Mossman Greenlees, Mrs Joseph Agnew, Elizabeth Patrick, Margaret M Campbell, Henrietta Robertson, treasurer Frieda Rohl, Jane Nisbet, Helen Salmon, Jane Cowan Wyper, Margaret Macdonald (not Margaret Macdonald Mackintosh), Isabella Ure and Mrs Provan. They were all students of staff at Glasgow School of Art, and were successful artists, teachers and art workers. Their first meeting, in 1882, was held in the studio of Robert Greenlees, Georgina Greenlees' father, who helped the group write a book of rules. The object of the society was "The study of Art, to be promoted by means of life classes and monthly meetings at which members will be required to exhibit sketches, and by an annual exhibition of members' work".

By 1895, the group had accumulated sufficient funds to allow the purchase of a house at No. 5 Blythswood Square. In their new premises it included a dining room, living room, bedrooms, studio space and a custom-designed gallery (added in 1895).    Having bedrooms within the clubs premises allowed the ladies to have a safe place to stay, where the ladies could stay alone without any questions asked, or judged by other members. 

By 1897 the partnership of George Henry Walton and Fred Rowntree had designed and constructed a gallery for the Club's fourteenth Annual Exhibition. In 1898, a fire in the club buildings destroyed the early records of the club.

Another disastrous fire on 27 May 1901 destroyed the Gallery and pictures for a special Summer Exhibition mounted in conjunction with the International Exhibition at Kelvingrove Art Gallery and Museum. The Gallery was rebuilt to the design of George Henry Walton and the first exhibition was held on 25 October 1902.  In 1907 a Decoration Committee commissioned Charles Rennie Mackintosh to carry out certain interior work and the striking black pedimented neo-classical front door.   Again in 1907,  The Society celebrated their 25th Anniversary with an exhibition opened by Sir D. Y. Cameron in October that year.  The Club thrived over the following 64 years until 1971 when it was sold to the Scottish Arts Council. 

Some members were determined to revive the Society, which duly happened in 1975 when it was renamed The Glasgow Society of Women Artists with a Centenary Exhibition being held in the Collins Gallery  in 1982.

Members
Janet Aitken (artist) (1873-1941)
Katharine Cameron (1874-1965)
Stansmore Dean Stevenson (1866-1944)
de Courcy Lewthwaite Dewar (1878-1959)
Georgina Greenlees (1849-1932)
Jessie Keppie (1868-1951)
Jessie M King (1875-1949)
Ann Macbeth (1875-1948)
Jessie Newbery (1864-1948)
Dorothy Carleton Smyth (1880-1933)

References

Art societies
Organisations based in Glasgow
Glasgow School of Art
Organizations established in 1882
1882 establishments in Scotland
Arts organisations based in Scotland
Culture in Glasgow
1882 in art
Arts organizations established in the 1880s
20th-century British women artists
Glasgow School
Alumni of the Glasgow School of Art
Clubs and societies in Glasgow